Elatine alsinastrum is a member of the genus Elatine in the plant family Elatinaceae, the waterwort family.

Distribution and habitat
It is found in Europe and is considered endangered. Populations have also been found in Turkey's Çanakkale Province.

References

Elatinaceae
Plants described in 1753
Taxa named by Carl Linnaeus